Chiyotenzan Daihachirō (born February 6, 1976 as Daihachirō Sumi) is a former sumo wrestler from Osaka, Japan. His highest rank was komusubi.

Career
He was a premature baby, and had to spend more than a year and a half in an incubator. 
Chiyotenzan made his professional debut in March 1991, joining the Kokonoe stable that was then home to yokozuna Chiyonofuji and Hokutoumi. He reached the second highest jūryō division in January 1997, and the top makuuchi division two years after that. He had an explosive start to his makuuchi career, winning three special prizes in his first three tournaments (the first wrestler ever to do so) and reaching the fourth highest rank of komusubi in July 1999. However, that was to be his only tournament in the top ranks and his initial promise quickly faded. His last winning score in the top division came in November 2001 and after suffering a fractured leg in the January 2002 tournament he fell back to jūryō in July 2002. Hampered by diabetes, his fortunes slumped even further. After making a final appearance in the sekitori ranks in November 2005, in January 2006 he was demoted to the unsalaried makushita division, and in May 2007, to the fourth sandanme division. He reappeared in makushita in September 2007, but won only one match before withdrawing. By November he had fallen to sandanme 27, the second lowest rank ever held by a former sanyaku wrestler.

Retirement from sumo
After losing his first bout in the January 2008 tournament, Chiyotenzan announced his retirement. He was unable to obtain an elder position in the Japan Sumo Association and has left the sumo world completely.

Fighting style
Chiyotenzan's favoured kimarite or techniques were migi-yotsu (a left hand outside, right hand inside grip on the opponent's mawashi), yori kiri (force out) and uwatenage (overarm throw).

Career record

See also
List of sumo tournament second division champions
Glossary of sumo terms
List of past sumo wrestlers
List of komusubi

References

External links

1976 births
Living people
Japanese sumo wrestlers
People from Osaka
Sumo people from Osaka Prefecture
Komusubi
Kokonoe stable sumo wrestlers